The following is a list of notable events and releases of the year 1959 in Norwegian music.

Events

February
 16 – The Norwegian National Opera and Ballet holds its first performance in Folketeatret in Oslo.

May
 29 – The 7th Bergen International Festival started in Bergen, Norway (29 May – 14 June).

Deaths

 June
 3 – Ole Windingstad, orchestra conductor, pianist and composer (born 1886).
 21 – Fridtjof Backer-Grøndahl, pianist, composer and music teacher (born 1885).

Births

 January
 7 – Jon Larsen, guitarist, composer, surrealistic painter, author, scientific researcher, and record producer.
 24 – Nils Mathisen, jazz keyboardist, multi-instrumentalist, and composer

 February
 27 – Geir Botnen, classical pianist.

 March
 3 – Frode Alnæs, jazz guitarist and composer, Dance with a Stranger and Masqualero.
 15
 Eivind Rølles, singer and guitarist, The Monroes (died 2013).
 Mattis Hætta, Sami singer and recording artist.
 25 – Per Hillestad, drummer and record producer, Lava.
 30 – Nils Jansen, jazz saxophonist and clarinetist.

  April
 5 – Elin Rosseland, jazz singer, bandleader, and composer.
 27 – Odd Magne Gridseth, jazz bassist.

 June
 19 – Diesel Dahl, drummer, TNT.

 July
 28 – Bjørn Ole Rasch, keyboardist, composer, music arranger and producer.

 August
 6 – Sigurd Køhn jazz saxophonist, composer, and band leader (died 2004).
 20 – Gaute Storaas, jazz bassist and composer.
 27 – Frode Fjellheim, yoiker and keyboardist, Transjoik.

 September
 14 – Morten Harket, singer, A-ha.
 30 – Hilde Heltberg, singer, guitarist and songwriter (died 2011).

 October
 20 – Ole Hamre, jazz drummer, percussionist, and composer.
 24 – Per Eirik Johansen, rock singer and music manager (died 2014)

 November
 30 – Lars Anders Tomter, classical viola player.

 December
 29 – Jørn Christensen, artist, actor, and record producer.
 30 – Kåre Thomsen, jazz guitarist and graphic designer.

 Unknown date
 Bjørn Jenssen, jazz drummer, Dance with a Stranger.

See also
 1959 in Norway
 Music of Norway

References

 
Norwegian music
Norwegian
Music
1950s in Norwegian music